E. V. V. Cinema is an Indian film production house founded by E. V. V. Satyanarayana.

Filmography

References 

Film production companies based in Hyderabad, India
Entertainment companies of India
Year of establishment missing